The Samoan triller (Lalage sharpei), known in Samoan as miti tae, is a species of bird in the family Campephagidae. It is endemic to Samoa. Its natural habitats are subtropical or tropical moist lowland forest and plantations. It is threatened by habitat loss.

Description
The Samoan triller is a bird with a length of about 13 cm, smaller than its relative, the Polynesian triller. There is no sexual dimorphism in Samoan trillers, with both sexes possessing similar plumage, a yellow bill, and white iris. The upperparts of the plumage range from a brown to a grey-brown. The underparts, chest, and throat are white, with faint brown bars present on the bird's flanks.

References

Birds of Samoa
Lalage (bird)
Birds described in 1900
Taxonomy articles created by Polbot